Balutak-e Sheykhan (also Romanized as Balūţak-e Sheykhān and Balūtak-e Sheykhān; also known as Boneh Sheykhān) is a village in Howmeh-ye Gharbi Rural District, in the Central District of Izeh County, Khuzestan Province, Iran. At the 2006 census, its population was 1,315, in 239 families.

References 

Populated places in Izeh County